Garti may refer to:
 Getti, Hormozgan, a village in Iran
 Netta Garti (born 1980), Israeli actress

See also 
 Gati (disambiguation)
 Gharti